Jaw Hill is a hill in the City of Leeds district of West Yorkshire, England. It is near Kirkhamgate in the City of Wakefield district.

History 

A large square cropmark enclosure was investigated in 1995, when it was thought to be a possible Roman marching camp. The site had V-shaped east and west ditches, both of which had evidence for a revetted defensive bank with lines of post-holes.

The base of a greyware vessel dating from the 2nd to 4th century was found on the site.

References

Archaeological sites in West Yorkshire
Roman sites in England
Places in Leeds